Requiem for a Dream is a 2000 American drama film directed by Darren Aronofsky.

Requiem for a Dream may also refer to:

Requiem for a Dream (novel), written by Hubert Selby, Jr. and on which the film is based
Requiem for a Dream (soundtrack), released with the film
"Lux Aeterna" (Mansell), the title theme from the film